Poensgen is a surname of:

 Ernst Poensgen (born 19 September 1871 in Düsseldorf; died July 22, 1949 in Bern), German entrepreneur and patron of the city of Düsseldorf
 Erwin Poensgen (1882-1966), Ambassador of Nazi Germany to Venezuela from 1937 until 1941
 Isabel Pfeiffer-Poensgen (born April 25, 1954 in Aachen), German politician
 Katja Poensgen (born September 23, 1976), German former professional motorcycle racer

Surnames